Greater Temuco is a Chilean conurbation composed of the cities of Temuco and Padre Las Casas in Araucanía Region of southern Chile. It has a population of 260,878, according to the 2002 census. Greater Temuco was formed when Temuco was divided into two administrative units, making the urban area spread into more than the Temuco commune. 
The population comprises Mapuche people as well as European immigrants, mainly Spaniards and Germans.

Populated places in Cautín Province
Temuco